Arthur Reinmann (1901–1983) was a Swiss weightlifter who competed in the 1924 Summer Olympics and in the 1928 Summer Olympics. In 1924 he won a bronze medal in the featherweight class. Four years later he finished fifth in the 1928 featherweight competition.

References

External links
profile

1901 births
1983 deaths
Swiss male weightlifters
Olympic weightlifters of Switzerland
Weightlifters at the 1924 Summer Olympics
Weightlifters at the 1928 Summer Olympics
Olympic bronze medalists for Switzerland
World record setters in weightlifting
Olympic medalists in weightlifting
Medalists at the 1924 Summer Olympics